Belisarius xambeui is a species of scorpion in the family Belisariidae. It is endemic to the eastern Pyrenees.

References

Scorpions of Europe
Fauna of the Pyrenees
Animals described in 1879
Taxa named by Eugène Simon